James Charles Watson (born August 19, 1952) is a Canadian former professional ice hockey defenceman who played ten seasons in the National Hockey League (NHL) for the Philadelphia Flyers. He was inducted into the Flyers' Hall of Fame February 2016.  He played 2 games in the 1976 Canada Cup for Team Canada, which was arguably the greatest hockey team ever assembled.

Playing career

Watson was born in Smithers, British Columbia. He played with his older brother Joe for several seasons with the Flyers, winning the Stanley Cup together in 1974 and 1975.

Post-playing career
Watson currently coaches youth hockey for the Delco Phantoms Midget 18U-AA team. His previous team, the Philadelphia Little Flyers Midget 16U American AAA team won the 2008-2009 and 2009-2010 AYHL Championships. Watson also runs the Jim Watson Hockey Academy and Jim Watson Hockey Camp at Iceworks Skating Complex in Aston, Pennsylvania.

On June 30, 2015, the Flyers announced that Watson would be inducted into the Flyers Hall of Fame in a pre-game ceremony on February 29, 2016.

Personal life
Watson is the father of two sons who have played professional hockey. Chase Watson played college hockey with the Providence Friars and later played in the minors with the Reading Royals in the ECHL. Brett Watson played in two professional games for the Wheeling Nailers.

Awards and honours
Bill Hunter Memorial Trophy (1971–72)
WCHL First All-Star Team (1971–72)
Barry Ashbee Trophy
Played in NHL All-Star Game (1975, 1976, 1977, 1978, 1980)
Inducted into the Flyers Hall of Fame February 29, 2016

Career statistics

Regular season and playoffs

International

References

External links
 
Flyers History: Jimmy Watson
Meltzer, Bill Philadelphia Flyers Heroes of the Past: Jimmy Watson

1952 births
Calgary Centennials players
Canadian ice hockey defencemen
Ice hockey people from British Columbia
Living people
National Hockey League All-Stars
People from Smithers, British Columbia
Philadelphia Flyers draft picks
Philadelphia Flyers players
Richmond Robins players
Stanley Cup champions